Nicolas or Nicolás may refer to:

People

Given name
 Nicolas (given name)

Mononym
 Nicolas (footballer, born 1999), Brazilian footballer
 Nicolas (footballer, born 2000), Brazilian footballer

Surname

Nicolas
 Dafydd Nicolas (c.1705–1774), Welsh poet
 Jean Nicolas (1913–1978), French international football player
 Nicholas Harris Nicolas (1799–1848), English antiquary
 Paul Nicolas (1899–1959), French international football player
 Robert Nicolas (1595–1667), English politician

Nicolás
 Adolfo Nicolás (1936–2020), Superior General of the Society of Jesus
 Eduardo Nicolás (born 1972), Spanish former professional tennis player

Other uses
 Nicolas (wine retailer), a French chain of wine retailers
 Le Petit Nicolas, a series of children's books by René Goscinny

See also
 San Nicolás (disambiguation)
 Nicholas (disambiguation)
 Nicola (disambiguation)
 Nikola, a given name